The 2012–13 LEN Champions League was the 50th edition of LEN's premier competition for men's water polo clubs. It ran from 14 September 2012 to 1 June 2013, and it was contested by thirty teams from eighteen countries. There was no defending champion as Pro Recco renounced to the competition for disagreements with the FIN on the number of allowed foreign players in the Italian clubs' squads. Runner-up Primorje Rijeka, former champions Mladost Zagreb and Vasas Budapest, Italy's CN Posillipo and any team from Montenegro also declined to take part in the competition. The Final Four (semifinals, final, and third place game) took place on May 31 and June 1 in Belgrade.

The final was played in front of 4,000 fans.

Qualification round

Group A (Tbilisi)

Group B (Kreuzlingen)

Preliminary round

Group A

Group B

Group C

Group D

Top 16 

The draw was held on 28 February 2013 in Rome, Italy. The first legs were played on 9–10 March, and the second legs were played on 20–21 March 2013.

Quarterfinals 
The draw was held on 25 March 2013 in Rome, Italy. The first legs were played on 17 April, and the second legs were played on 30 April and 1 May 2013.

Final Four (Belgrade)
Tašmajdan Sports Center, Belgrade, Serbia

Semi-finals

Third place

Final

Final standings

Awards

References

External links
 Results

 
LEN Champions League seasons
Champions League
2012 in water polo
2013 in water polo